The 2021 UCLA Bruins baseball team represented the University of California, Los Angeles during the 2021 NCAA Division I baseball season. The Bruins played their home games at Jackie Robinson Stadium as a member of the Pac-12 Conference. They were led by head coach John Savage, in his 16th season at UCLA.

Previous season

The 2020 UCLA Bruins baseball team notched a 13–2 (0–0) regular season record. The season prematurely ended on March 12, 2020 due to concerns over the COVID-19 pandemic.

Game log

Rankings

2021 MLB draft
UCLA had an NCAA-High ten players selected in the draft.

References

External links 
 UCLA Bruins baseball

UCLA Bruins
UCLA Bruins baseball seasons
UCLA Bruins baseball
UCLA